Robin French Wynne (born February 15, 1953) is an Arkansas Supreme Court justice elected in 2014. He was previously a judge on the Arkansas Court of Appeals, District 5 from 2011 until being sworn into the Arkansas Supreme Court in 2015.  Prior to serving on the Court of Appeals, he was the Dallas County District Judge between 2004 and 2010.

Education
Robin F. Wynne received his Bachelor of Arts from Harvard University in 1975 and his Juris Doctor degree from the University of Arkansas School of Law in 1978. He attended the Perkins School of Theology at Southern Methodist University in Dallas, Texas, from 1979 to 1980.

Elections

2010
Wynne ran unopposed and was elected in 2010 to finish a term on the Arkansas Court of Appeals to fill the District 5 seat vacated by Michael Kinard.

2012
Wynne ran unopposed and was re-elected to the District 5 seat on the Arkansas Court of Appeals.

2014
Wynne was elected to an 8-year term on the Arkansas Supreme Court, beating Maumelle, Arkansas attorney Tim Cullen.  Wynne won the election by a 52% to 48% margin.  Wynne replaced retiring justice Donald L. Corbin.

2022
Wynne ran for re-election to the Arkansas Supreme Court in the May General election.  Wynne was the top vote getter in the three-way race against Chris Carnahan and David Sterling, garnering 49.5% of the vote.  A Two-round system run-off election occurred on November 8, 2022 between Wynne and Carnahan, who garnered 28.8% of the general election vote.  Wynne won the run-off election with 58.4% of the vote. Wynne's second term on the Arkansas Supreme Court ends in 2030.

Career

From 1985 to 1988 Wynne represented the 91st district of the Arkansas House of Representatives as a Democrat, comprising parts of Dallas, Cleveland, and Lincoln counties. From 1989 to 1998 Wynne was a deputy prosecuting attorney for the Thirteenth Judicial District of Arkansas, the jurisdiction including Dallas County. Beginning in 1989 Wynne also served as city attorney of Fordyce, Arkansas, the county seat of Dallas County.  Wynne also served as the Dallas County, Arkansas district judge from 2004 to 2010.

References

External links
Arkansas Supreme Court

1953 births
Living people
Arkansas lawyers
Harvard University alumni
Arkansas state court judges
Justices of the Arkansas Supreme Court
University of Arkansas alumni
21st-century American judges